Canguçu (population: 56,211) is a city in Rio Grande do Sul, south Brazil. East Pomeranian, a dialect of Low German, has co-official status in Canguçu.

References

Municipalities in Rio Grande do Sul